Beka is a Georgian masculine given name. Notable people with the name include:

Monarchs
Beka I Jaqeli, Georgian ruling prince 1285-1306
Beka II Jaqeli, Georgian ruling prince 1361-1391
Beka III Jaqeli, Georgian ruling prince 1625-1635

People
Beka Mikeltadze, Georgian footballer
Beka Kavtaradze, Georgian water polo player
Beka Kavtaradze, Georgian footballer
Beka Burjanadze, Georgian basketball player
Beka Gigashvili, Georgian rugby union player
Beka Gviniashvili, Georgian judoka
Beka Vachiberadze, Georgian footballer
Beka Lomtadze, Georgian wrestler
Beka Sheklashvili, Georgian rugby union player
Beka Kakabadze, Georgian rugby union player
Beka Tugushi, Georgian footballer
Beka Gorgadze, Georgian rugby union player
Beka Bitsadze, Georgian rugby union player
Beka Gotsiridze, Georgian footballer
Beka Saghinadze, Georgian rugby union player
Beka Kurkhuli, Georgian writer
Beka Tsiklauri, Georgian rugby union player

Georgian masculine given names